George Edward Brunner (January 12, 1896 – February 8, 1975) was an American Democratic Party politician from New Jersey who served as the Mayor of Camden, New Jersey from 1936 to 1959.

Biography
Brunner was born in 1896 in Newark, New Jersey to Eugene and Bertha (Zehnder) Brunner, both natives of Switzerland. He attended parochial schools in West New York before serving as an apprentice in the plumbing and heating trade. He worked as a journeyman and eventually settled in Camden.

Brunner took an interest in Democratic politics in Camden and in 1931 he was elected to the Camden County Board of Chosen Freeholders. He served until 1935, when he was elected to the Camden City Board of Commissioners as part of a coalition ticket. He became Mayor of Camden, New Jersey that same year when his coalition defeated the Republican organization of the previous mayor, Frederick Von Neida.  
 
Brunner consolidated Democratic power in the city of Camden and its surrounding county, and he would go on to serve six four-year terms as mayor before his organization lost control of the city government in 1959. He was defeated by Alfred R. Pierce and his "Save Our City" ticket, a coalition supported by much of the Hispanic community.  
 
Brunner also became prominent in statewide politics, running unsuccessfully for United States Senate against H. Alexander Smith in 1946 and serving as chairman of the New Jersey Democratic State Committee from 1954 until 1961. He assisted in the careers of two Governors of New Jersey, Robert B. Meyner and Richard J. Hughes, as well as  Harrison A. Williams the United States Senator, and William F. Hyland the New Jersey Attorney General.

Brunner died at his home in Haddon Township in 1975 at the age of 79.

References

External links
Biographical information for George E. Brunner from The Political Graveyard

1896 births
1975 deaths
People from Haddon Township, New Jersey
Politicians from Newark, New Jersey
People from West New York, New Jersey
County commissioners in New Jersey
Chairmen of the New Jersey Democratic State Committee
Mayors of Camden, New Jersey
20th-century American politicians